The Dextro Energy Triathlon – ITU World Championship Series 2010 was a series of six World Championship Triathlon Events leading to a Grand Final held in Budapest, Hungary in September 2010. The Series was organised under the auspices of the world governing body of triathlon – the International Triathlon Union (ITU) – and was sponsored by the company Dextro Energy.

Series events
The series touched down on three continents, stopping in some locations used in the 2009 series, as well as some new ones. Budapest was a successful new venue for the ITU World Cup/World Championships.

Results

Overall world championship
Points were distributed at each World Championship Event to the top 40 finishers in the men's and women's elite races, and to the top 50 finishers at the Grand Final. Points towards the ITU World Championship ranking could also be obtained at the World Cup events. The sum of each athlete's best four points scores in the World Championship and World Cup Events (maximum of two World Cup scores) and the points score from the World Championship Grand Final determined the final ranking.

Men's championship

Full ranking:

Women's championship

Full ranking:

Event medalists

Men

Women

References

External links

Dextro Energy Triathlon – ITU World Championship Series – Official website

World Triathlon Series
World Championships
2010 in Hungarian sport
International sports competitions hosted by Hungary
Triathlon competitions in Hungary